Loon Lake is a village in the Canadian province of Saskatchewan within the Rural Municipality of Loon Lake No. 561 and Census Division No. 17. The Makwa Sahgaiehcan First Nation reserve is to the east of the village. The village is located on Highway 26 north-east of the city of Lloydminster.

Demographics 

History 
Loon Lake incorporated as a village on January 1, 1950.

The battle was fought on June 3, 1885 and resulted in the defeat of the Cree First Nations band government which ended the rebellion. It is a National Historic Site of Canada and part of Steele Narrows Provincial Park.

Attractions 
Loon Lake has a 9-hole grass greens golf course with a licensed dining area. The village offers postal, food, gas, banking services. There are also two resorts, Pine Cove and Makwa Lake, that offer rental cabins.

About 5 km to the west of the village is Makwa Lake Provincial Park and on nearby Jumbo Lake is Silver Birch Bible Camp. There are seven fresh water lakes within 5 miles (8 km) of the village with recreation opportunities.

Every fall, there is big game hunting within 10 miles (16 km) with a variety of outfitters.

Climate 
Loon Lake has a subarctic climate (Dfc) long, bitterly cold winters lasting more than half of the year and short but warm, and rainy summers with cool nights.

See also
 List of communities in Saskatchewan
 List of villages in Saskatchewan

References

External links 

Villages in Saskatchewan
Loon Lake No. 561, Saskatchewan
Division No. 17, Saskatchewan